Richardt Strydom (born 24 September 1971) is an artist, creative and educator based in Johannesburg. He was Senior Lecturer in Graphic Design at the North-West University in Potchefstroom.

Strydom has received a number of awards including an ABSA l'Atelier Merit Award (1997), a SASOL New Signatures Merit Award (1997), Overall Winner of the SASOL New Signatures Competition in 2008, and Outstanding Visual Artist Award, Stellenbosch Woordfees 2010. for an artist book, Ad Hominem, in collaboration with Jaco Burger.

Biography 

Strydom was born in Mossel Bay, studied at Vaal Technicon (now Vaal University of Technology) and the North-West University and currently lives and works in Johannesburg.

Artist overview

When studying in the early 1990s, Strydom took inspiration from South African Resistance Art of the late 1980s. Ever since Strydom's art has explored the boundaries of cultural and art traditions and identity, as these intersect with everyday life. South African Resistance Art of the late 1980s and early 1990s has had a lasting influence on his oeuvre and art making.

As an artist, Strydom has participated in numerous national and international art as well as design exhibitions. 
Recent examples include: Design of Dissent, School of Visual Arts, New York (2005) and Payne Gallery, Pennsylvania, USA (2007); Boere Kitch (2007) Klein Karoo Nasionale Kunstefees (curated by Gordon Froud); Oor die einders van die bladsy (2010), Stellenbosch and FADA Gallery Johannesburg, and L'origine du monde (2010) at Aardklop National Arts Festival, Potchefstroom (curated by Paul Boulitreau). Strydom's first solo exhibition A verbis ad verbera – From Words to Blows was part of the official 2010 Aardklop National Arts Festival programme. One of Strydom's works were also included in The Design of Dissent: Socially and Politically Driven Graphics.

He was co-curator (2004–2005) as well as curator (2006–2008) of the Aardklop National Arts Festival visual arts programme.

In 2010 he received his master's degree in Art History from the North-West University.  His Masters' dissertation offers a postcolonial reading of the depiction of Afrikaner ancestry in the works of the 19th century explorer artist Charles Davidson Bell.

Strydom was appointed to the adjudication panel for the 2019 Helgaard Steyn Award for Painting.

Exhibitions

Solo exhibitions

2010 	A verbis ad verbera – From words to blows, Snowflake building, Aardklop National Arts Festival, Potchefstroom.
2011 	A verbis ad verbera II – From words to blows II, Artspace, Parkwood, Johannesburg.
2014		BLEEK: photographic and audiovisual works 2010 – 2014, Die Gallery, North-West, University, Potchefstroom.
2016		BLEEK, Johannesburg Art Gallery, Johannesburg.
2018 White Masks, Kalashnikovv Gallery, Johannesburg.

Selected group exhibitions 

  2005 Design of Dissent,   School of Visual Arts, New York, USA. 
 2011 Lens: fractions of contemporary photography and video in South Africa,  SASOL Art Museum, University of Stellenbosch. 
 2012		A shot to the arse, Michaelis Galleries, UCT, Cape Town.
 2013 NWU Art Collection: Looking back while moving forward,   North-West University Gallery, NWU, Potchefstroom.
 2014 TWENTY: Contemporary South African Art,  Turchin Centre, Appalachian State University, Boone, North Carolina USA.
 2015		Aphrodisiac, Equus Gallery, Cavalli Estate, Stellenbosch.
 2016 Figuratively Speaking: Selected works from the NWU and MTN art collections,  Aardklop, North-West University Gallery, NWU, Potchefstroom. 
 2016	Lords of Winter,  Equus Gallery, Cavalli Estate, Stellenbosch.
 2019 SELF,  The Gallery at Glen Carlou, Stellenbosch.

Exhibitions curated

2004	Suffering of War, Alumni Hall, North-West University, Aardklop National Arts Festival, Potchefstroom.
2005	Skoot – street photography exhibition, Aardklop National Arts Festival Potchefstroom.
2007 STREEK, Aardklop National Arts Festival, Potchefstroom.
2008	Braam Kruger – No More Holy Cows (Memorial Exhibition), Snowflake Building, Aardklop National Arts Festival, Potchefstroom.
2012 	Dismotief, Aardklop National Arts Festival, City Hall, Potchefstroom.

Art awards

1995	Highly Commended, Kempton Park/Tembisa Fine Arts Competition.
1997	SASOL New Signatures – Merit Award
1997	Volkskas Atelier – Merit Award
2008	Overall Winner, SASOL New Signatures
2010 Outstanding visual artist award, Stellenbosch Woordfees

References

External links 
  Artist's website
  Artist's personal blog

1971 births
Living people
Afrikaner people
South African people of Dutch descent
People from Mossel Bay
South African photographers
North-West University alumni
South African contemporary artists